The Astronomy Centre at the University of Sussex, UK  undertakes research in Astronomy, Astrophysics and Cosmology.

The centre today 

The Astronomy Centre boasts 12 permanent Faculty members and 12 Postdoctoral Research Fellows, as well as many PhD and MSc students.

Their scientific research interests are tightly focused on the early universe, observational cosmology, large-scale structure formation, galaxy clusters and galactic formation and evolution. These problems are examined with a combination of theoretical, numerical and observational techniques.

Members of the Astronomy Centre have been and are involved in many international collaborations including the Dark Energy Survey,  Herschel Space Observatory, LOFAR, Square Kilometre Array, Galaxy And Mass Assembly survey, Planck (spacecraft) and POLARBEAR.

History 
The Astronomy Centre began in 1965 with the founding of an MSc course, run jointly with the Royal Greenwich Observatory, then based at Herstmonceux in Sussex . This link contains also a link to an article by Roger Tayler on the first 30 years of astronomy at Sussex.

Alumni 
The Astronomy Centre has a number of famous former and current members;

 John D. Barrow
 John Gribbin 
 Andrew R. Liddle
 William McCrea 
 Leon Mestel
 Bernard Pagel
 Martin Rees, Baron Rees of Ludlow
 Roger Tayler 

Astronomy institutes and departments
University of Sussex